The following is a list of notable events and releases of the year 1948 in Norwegian music.

Events

 Egil Monn-Iversen initiated the song group "The Monn Keys" (1948–1964).

Deaths

Births

 January
 29 – Espen Rud, jazz drummer, composer, and music arranger.

 March
 1 – Konrad Kaspersen, jazz upright bassist.
 1 – Hans Rotmo, singer and songwriter, Vømmøl Spellmannslag.
 19 – Henning Gravrok, jazz saxophonist and music teacher.
 24 – Frode Gjerstad, jazz saxophonist.
 26 – Kåre Jostein Simonsen, bandoneonist.

 May
 1 – Carl Morten Iversen, jazz upright bassist.

 June
 17 – Hege Tunaal, folk singer.

 October
 4 – Steinar Ofsdal, flautist and composer.
 22 – Håkon Austbø, classical pianist.
 29 – Audun Tylden, record producer (died 2011)
 31 – Knut Buen, fiddler, composer, folklorist, and publisher.

 November
 22 – Jens Harald Bratlie, pianist.

 December
 22 – Stein Ove Berg, singer and songwriter (died 2002).

See also
 1948 in Norway
 Music of Norway

References

 
Norwegian music
Norwegian
Music
1940s in Norwegian music